The 1925 Texas Tech Matadors football team was an American football team that represented Texas Technological College (now known as Texas Tech University) as an independent during the 1925 college football season. In its first season of intercollegiate football, Texas Tech compiled a 6–1–2 record. Windy Nicklaus was the team captain. The team played its home games at the South Plains Fairgrounds in Lubbock, Texas.

The school opened for business in the fall of 1925.  University president Paul W. Horn presided over the first meeting of its faculty being held on September 15, 1925.

Ewing Y. Freeland was hired as the school's athletic director and coach in June 1925. He had been a star athlete at Vanderbilt and the coach at SMU in 1922 and 1923.

On October 17, 1925, the team won the first game in program history, defeating Montezuma College of New Mexico by a 30–0 score.

On November 5, 1925, Texas Tech defeated Wayland Baptist by a score that has been reported as either 120–0 or 115–0. It remains Texas Tech's only 100-point game.

Key players included D.C. "Preacher" Calloway who was inducted into the Texas Tech Hall of Honor in 1985.

Schedule

References

Texas Tech
Texas Tech Red Raiders football seasons
Texas Tech Matadors football